Gür is a Turkish given name for males and a surname, which means bushy. It may refer to:

Surnames 
 Halil Gür (born 1951), Turkish Dutch author
 Olcay Gür (born 1991), Liechtensteiner football player of Turkish descent
 Ulf Kjell Gür (born 1951), Swedish theatre producer and singer/musician

See also 
 Hayri Gür Arena, indoor sporting arena in Turkey
 Tevfik Sırrı Gür Stadium, sports center in Turkey
 TCG Gür (1936), Basque-designed submarine of the Turkish Navy

References 

Turkish masculine given names
Turkish-language surnames